Activation energy asymptotics (AEA), also known as large activation energy asymptotics, is an asymptotic analysis used in the combustion field utilizing the fact that the reaction rate is extremely sensitive to temperature changes due to the large activation energy of the chemical reaction.

History
The techniques were pioneered by the Russian scientists Yakov Borisovich Zel'dovich, David A. Frank-Kamenetskii and co-workers in the 30s, in their study on premixed flames and thermal explosions (Frank-Kamenetskii theory), but not popular to western scientists until the 70s. In the early 70s, due to the pioneering work of Williams B. Bush, Francis E. Fendell, Forman A. Williams, Amable Liñán and John F. Clarke, it became popular in western community and since then it was widely used to explain more complicated problems in combustion.

Method overview
In combustion processes, the reaction rate  is dependent on temperature  in the following form (Arrhenius law),

In general, the condition  is satisfied, where  is the burnt gas temperature. This condition forms the basis for activation energy asymptotics. Denoting  for unburnt gas temperature, one can define the Zel'dovich number and heat release parameter as follows

In addition, if we define a non-dimensional temperature 

such that  approaching zero in the unburnt region and approaching unity in the burnt gas region (in other words), then the ratio of reaction rate at any temperature to reaction rate at burnt gas temperature is given by

In other words, the reaction rate is negligible everywhere, except in a small region very close to burnt gas temperature, where . Thus, in solving the conservation equations, one identifies two different regimes, at leading order,

Outer convective-diffusive zone
Inner reactive-diffusive layer

where in the convective-diffusive zone, reaction term will be neglected and in the thin reactive-diffusive layer, convective terms can be neglected and the solutions in these two regions are stitched together by matching slopes using method of matched asymptotic expansions. The above mentioned two regime are true only at leading order since the next order corrections may involve all the three transport mechanisms.

See also
Zeldovich–Frank-Kamenetskii equation
Burke–Schumann limit

References

Fluid dynamics
Combustion
Asymptotic_analysis